In political science, triangular diplomacy is a foreign policy of the United States, developed during the Vietnam War (1955–1975) by Henry Kissinger, as a means to manage relations between the contesting communist powers, the Soviet Union and China. Connecting heavily with the correlating policy of linkage, the policy was intended to exploit the ongoing rivalry between the two Communist powers (following the Sino-Soviet split [1956–1966]), as a means to strengthen American hegemony and diplomatic interest.

Interrelating primarily with the subsequent development of the détente era (1969–1979) during the Cold War, triangular diplomacy was instituted in order to prevent the decline of American authority during the Vietnam War following the perceived inefficiencies of George Kennan's defensive policy of containment and Dwight Eisenhower's offensive policy of rollback. Hence, triangular diplomacy was an instrumental facet in the shifting of Cold War policy toward talks of co-operation and diplomacy, and thus set a precedent for the eventual relaxation of tensions between the two superpowers through a focus on mutual benefit (as evidenced in the Strategic Arms Limitation Talks (SALT) and the Strategic Arms Reduction (START) treaties).

Terminology 
In principle, the policy of triangular diplomacy seeks to link the interests of three powerful states in order to retain a balance of power within the international system. Most commonly, this involves an insecure state (or states) pursuing strategic alliances or economic deals in an attempt to both weaken the hegemony of a powerful adversary and strengthen their own position. First developed by U.S. advisor Henry Kissinger during the Vietnam War era, the policy was argued to be most effective when reliant upon “the natural incentives and propensities of the players.”

Conceived in a period of American political weakness, Kissinger's doctrine argues that foreign policy needed to rely on a combination of diplomacy and military power in order to bring benefits to all relevant players, and subsequently ensure international stability. This doctrine heavily relates to a neorealist analysis of international politics, professed by scholars such as Kenneth Waltz. Kissinger's desires to seek a “coalition” with China in order to stabilise the power of the Soviet Union reflects the neorealist balance of power theory, as insecure states are seeking to bring an equilibrium to the international order in an attempt to bring peace and benefit the relevant actors.

Vietnam War 
Entering into the White House during the height of the Vietnam War, one of Kissinger's primary intentions with his policy was to gain Soviet and Chinese assistance in softening North Vietnamese troops, and withdrawing from the conflict with dignity. The Sino-Soviet split offered a ripe opportunity for Kissinger and Nixon to enact such a policy, intended by offering integration into the international trade system, scientific and technological resources and a stabilization of bilateral relations. The first instance of this rapprochement and the beginnings of triangular diplomacy within US policy is reflected in a 14 August 1969 National Security meeting, in which Nixon positioned his intentions to victimise China within the Sino-Soviet split and seek to offer assistance.  

The following 1972 Beijing and Moscow summits further exacerbated the existing tensions between China and the Soviet Union, allowing Nixon and Kissinger to gain Soviet co-operation on matters deemed important to U.S. foreign policy. This can be examined in the outcome of the 1972 Spring Offensive, as the United States were able to gain diplomatic co-operation in reaching a peace with North Vietnamese forces. Many scholars contend that Nixon's rapprochement with China, as part of the triangular diplomacy framework, was an instrumental facet in the dissolution of the Vietnam War. Historian Raymond Garthoff argues that triangular diplomacy held a significant bearing on the settlement of the Vietnam War, whilst Jussi Hanhimäki contends that the policy played a critical role in bringing about changes in North Vietnamese negotiation strategy.  

However, triangular diplomacy did not ensure immediate stability and peaceful cooperation. The Vietnam War continued in full force for three years after the emergence of the policy, with continued U.S.-Soviet conflict evolving underneath. For Kissinger and Nixon, the policy was secondary to national interests and security concerns, as the nation needed to appear politically powerful against adversaries.

Détente 
Following the Vietnam War, Kissinger sought to reshape the U.S. approach to international relations, seeking a balance of power which can produce stability between the three key players in the international system; the Soviet Union, the United States, and China, and subsequently reduce military and political tensions. Triangular diplomacy consequently included the aim of achieving this balance of power and pursuing the policy of détente with the Soviet Union, as Nixon and Kissinger saw that correlating the interests of each power was instrumental in stabilizing the international order.

In The White House Years, Kissinger argued that the opening to China and détente with the Soviets were connected policies, intended to exploit the pre-existing tensions between the states in American interest. Stating that it was better for the United States “to be closer to either Moscow or Peking than either was to the other”, as American bargaining power would strengthen two-fold.

Key outcomes of triangular diplomacy during this period include the Strategic Arms Limitation Treaty (SALT), the signing of the Shanghai Communiqué and the Camp David Accords, each of which were achieved as a result of Kissinger and Nixon's policy.

However, depicted as a sign of American political weakness, the policy of détente was ultimately overhauled. American nationalists saw the policy as a way for the Soviet Union to manipulate the U.S. under the pretenses of diplomacy, evidenced by their refusal to ratify the Strategic Arms Limitation Treaty and the gains received from Willy Brandt's Ostpolitik. In addition, the Soviet invasion of Afghanistan in 1979 solidified the re-invigoration of Cold War hostilities and the conclusive end of the détente period. As a result, Nixon and Kissinger were removed from political power, to be succeeded by the administration of Gerald Ford, and triangular diplomacy was overlooked for the remainder of the Cold War.

After the Cold War 
Following the Cold War, the premise of triangular diplomacy shifted from Nixon and Kissinger's definition to a "coordinated action by two states (which, in keeping with the triangle metaphor, we refer to collectively as the base) to change behaviour of another state (the 'target')". As nuclear capabilities became an established facet within international relations policy, so to did continued attempts by United States administration to enforce triangular diplomacy with China and the United States. 

A key example of this dynamic is the 2001 Sino-Russian Treaty of Friendship, signed between Russian president Vladimir Putin and Chinese president, general secretary of the Communist Party Jiang Zemin. The signing of this treaty represented a diplomatic effort to strengthen Russian and Chinese influence in dealings with the United States, and a subsequent return to the triangular diplomacy framework. Results of this treaty included; the modernization of Chinese armed forces and stable levels of fuel shipments to aid the construction of the Eastern Siberia-Pacific Ocean oil pipeline, and the increase of Russian sources of capital following the dissolution of the Soviet state. The New York Times argued that while this manifestation of triangular diplomacy was "a new form…with diminished strategic significance", the treaty forces the U.S. to pay more regard to both nations and act in accordance with their wishes in order to ensure their unipolar political position, following the Cold War.

Indo-Pacific and United States relations 
The political interactions between the United States, India, and China have come to reflect this new wave of triangular diplomacy. Following the rise of China to parity with the United States, attentions turned to India, as the third largest Asian economy and fourth biggest spender on defence in the Indo-Pacific region, in order to connect political motivations regarding trade and naval capabilities. Following U.S.-Indian discussions regarding U.S. withdrawal from Afghanistan and fears of an eventuating power vacuum in the area, U.S. Secretary of Defense Leon Panetta stated that "New Delhi was a 'lynchpin' in a new US military strategy focused on Asia".

Seeking a policy to expand military presence in the Indo-Pacific, U.S. interests were subsequently met by assurances from the Chinese defense minister, Liang Guanglie, of improved relations and co-operation within the new Asian balance of power. However, the growing naval profiles of both China and India within the Pacific and subsequent localisations of military rivalry, position China within capability to establish unipolar control over the Asia-Pacific, thus spurring a  coalition between the U.S. and India. Nonetheless, coming with concerns from Indian leaders regarding the inconsistencies of American policy towards China. Scholar C. Raja Mohan contends that as a result, these ambiguities manifest in uncertainty surrounding the terms of triangular diplomacy being exercised in this instance, however cementing a certain "intersection of their maritime policies with those of the United States" and are "bound to churn the security politics of the Indo-Pacific for decades to come."

Ukraine crisis 
A contemporary reflection of triangular diplomacy can be examined through political interactions in regards to the Ukrainian crisis. In particular, the interactions between the United States, the European Union, and the Russian Federation. In attempts of the EU and U.S. to balance the power of Russia, this policy can be examined through the correlation of the EU and U.S. economic sanctions, the outsourcing of crisis resolution to the EU, Ukraine's efforts to increase transatlantic diplomacy and Russia's efforts to undermine it. In addition to marking the rise of the EU as a major international actor in foreign policy, the Ukraine crisis marks a shift in triangular diplomacy away from its neorealist inclination, to more of a liberal position regarding international cooperation, as the U.S. and EU sought to assist the Ukraine in an attempt to ensure peace as opposed to serving national interests.

Trump administration 
The foreign policy of the Trump administration has found similarities with that of triangular diplomacy; in particular, regarding American involvement in the Asia-Pacific region in an attempt to balance out the power of China. Washington advisors Alexander Gray and Peter Navarro have aligned their intentions to implement a more muscular foreign policy in the region, in order to manage the growing power of China through improved relations with Taiwan, hence implementing triangular diplomacy principles. Washington Post writer Marc Thiessen argues that this is to be achieved through free trade agreement and upgrading the state’s political representation, following Trump’s unstable position regarding the One China policy.

International relations theory 

The triangular diplomacy framework is contingent upon the realist and neorealist analysis of international politics, which advocates a zero sum form of geopolitical conflict, through which the overriding paradigms of statism, survival and self help define political interactions. By attempting to connect the interests of competing powers in order to manifest a mutual political benefit, Kissinger's policy reflects the realist balance of power theory which argues that national and global stability is secured when military capability is distributed correspondingly amongst states, in order to avoid global unipolarity.

As can be examined within the Vietnam War era, in the attempt of one state to ensure their own survival in the global anarchic system through increasing economic and military strength, this in turn fuels the insecurities of less powerful states. As a result, insecure states seek to form a coalition and subsequently balance out the power of their superior, thus bringing security to the international system. Hence, reflecting the formation of a coalition between the United States and China in response to the growing power of the Soviet Union within the Vietnamese sphere, in order to achieve a level of global stability through détente. As per scholar Raymond Aron, an achievement of this system will consequently manifest peace, as a “more or less lasting suspension of rivalry between political units”  will ensue.

However, as is evidenced from the inherent U.S. unipolarity which has marked the 21st century, and failures of triangular diplomacy to substantiate such a peace, scholars Wohlforth, Little and Kaufman argue that these facets evidence the failures of the balance of power theory to correlate within the contemporary international environment. Moreover, positioning triangular diplomacy as a point of contention within international relations theory, as whilst its tenets subscribe to realist thought, its developments within the contemporary era have positioned it against a constructivist or post-structuralist approach to international politics, advocated by scholars such as Wendt.

Notes

References

Websites 
 "China, Russia to honor commitments on oil pipeline". China Daily. 2003.
 "China terms defence minister's India visit a success." The Times of India. 2012.
 "India 'lynchpin' for US strategy in Asia: Panetta". The Express Tribune. 2012.
 "Putin: oil pipeline will serve China first". China Daily. 2005.
 "Triangular Diplomacy". The New York Times. 2001.
 Kuo, Kendrick (2013). "Nixon's Opening to China: The Misleading Apotheosis of Triangular Diplomacy". E-International Relations Students. Retrieved from Nixon’s Opening to China: The Misleading Apotheosis of Triangular Diplomacy
 Kuo, Raymond (2017). "Can Trumpian Triangular Diplomacy Work?". The Diplomat. Retrieved from Can Trumpian Triangular Diplomacy Work?
 Lukacsova, V. (2009). Kissinger's Triangular Diplomacy.
 Mohan, C. Raja (2012). "The New Triangular Diplomacy: India, China and America at Sea". The Diplomat.
 Sempa, Francis (2016). "Is Kissinger's Triangular Diplomacy the answer to Sino Russian Rapprochement?". The Diplomat.
 Thiessen, Marc (2016). "Trump's Taiwan call wasn't a blunder. It was brilliant". The Washington Post.

Books 
 Aron, R. (1966). Peace and War. New York: Doubleday 
 Birchfield, Vicki; Young, Alisdair (2018). Triangular diplomacy among the United States, the European Union, and the Russian Federation: Responses to the Crisis in Ukraine. Cham, Switzerland: Springer International Publishing AG.
 Dunne, T., & Schmidt, B. C. (2014). Realism. In S. Baylis & Owens (Eds.), The globalization of world politics: an introduction to international relations. Oxford: Oxford University Press. 
 Garthoff, Raymond (1994). Détente and Confrontation. Washington: Brookings. 
 Kegley, Charles; Wittkopf, Eugene (2005). World Politics: Trend and Transformation. Boston: Bedford/St. Martin's.
 Kissinger, Henry (1979). The White House Years. Sydney: Hodder and Stoughton.
Mohan, C. Raja (2012). Samudra Manthan Sino-Indian Rivalry in the Indo-Pacific. Washington D.C.: Carnegie Endowment for International Peace.
 Morales, Gilbert (2005). Critical Perspectives on the Vietnam War. New York: The Rosen Publishing Group.
 Waltz, Kenneth (2008). Realism and International Politics. New York: Routledge.
 Waltz, K. (1979). Theory of International Politics. Boston: McGraw-Hill Higher Education

Journals 
 Hanhimaki, Jussi (2003). "Selling the 'Decent interval': Kissinger, triangular diplomacy, and the end of the Vietnam war, 1971–73". Diplomacy and Statecraft. 14:1, 159–194.
 Keohane, Robert (2012). "Twenty Years of Institutional Liberalism". International Relations. 26(2): 125–138.
 Wohlforth, W., Little, R., & Kaufman, S. (2007). Testing Balance-of-Power Theory in World History. European Journal of International Relations, 13(2), 155–185.

Further reading 
 Ngoei, W (2017). A wide anticommunist Arc": Britain, ASEAN, and Nixon's triangular diplomacy. Diplomatic History, 41(5). Within this work, Cold War historian Ngoei employs his specialised analysis of US-SE Asian foreign relations in order to confirm the successes of triangular diplomacy in cementing US hegemony over Indochina. By challenging the predominately Americentric accounts of Cold War foreign policy, Ngoei examines the methods through which ideological prejudice engendered the success of Kissinger's policies, against the repercussions of this policy under modern American administration.
 Birchfield, V., & Young, A. (2018). Triangular Diplomacy among the United States, the European Union, and the Russian Federation Responses to the Crisis in Ukraine. Cham: Springer International Publishing.  By examining the current Ukraine crisis through the prism of triangular diplomacy, Young and Birchfield analyse the developments of the policy during the post-Cold War era, particularly concerning the rise of the EU to international authority. The amalgamation of their methodology and reputability delegates credibility to their account, and positions it as paramount to a study of the modern developments of triangular diplomacy, through their panoramic perspective of transnational relations.
 Doyle, R. (2014). The geopolitical power shift in the Indo-Pacific region : America, Australia, China, and triangular diplomacy in the twenty-first century .  Lanham, Maryland: Lexington Books. As a trained historian, Doyle analyses the decline in US international authority against the modern developments of triangular diplomacy, as a result of a post-Cold War power shift in the Indo-Pacific geopolitical region. His authoritative methodology manifests a highly credible account on these changes within the nature of triangular diplomacy, and the epochal international policy developing within the Indo-Pacific theatre as a result of the declining authority of the US.
 Hanhimaki, J. (2003). Selling the “Decent interval”: Kissinger, triangular diplomacy, and the end of the Vietnam war, 1971–73. Diplomacy & Statecraft, 14(1), 159–194. As a leading historian on Cold War international relations, Hanhimaki's comprehensive account of triangular diplomacy allows for a multifaceted insight into Kissinger's motivations behind the policy. His interdisciplinary methodology, in addition to the credibility gained through publication in the Diplomacy & Statecraft journal, sets Hanhimaki's work as invaluable to a study of triangular diplomacy, through his fresh insights into Kissinger's subsequent provocation of Sino-Soviet competition in Indochina.
 Daum, A., Gardner, L., & Mausbach, W. (2003). America, the Vietnam War, and the world : comparative and international perspectives . Washington, D.C: German Historical Institute.  In this work, renowned theorists; Daum, Gardner and Mausbach analyse the global repercussions of triangular diplomacy during the Vietnam War, with a salient focus on its socio-political, economic, cultural and intellectual consequences. By analysing the policy against subsequent cold war conflicts, this account resides as a staple within a disciplinary analysis of Vietnam war foreign policy, and thus to a study of triangular diplomacy.

United States foreign policy
Cold War
Diplomacy
International relations theory
China–United States relations
Soviet Union–United States relations